Gaspard de la nuit (subtitled Trois poèmes pour piano d'après Aloysius Bertrand), M. 55 is a suite of piano pieces by Maurice Ravel, written in 1908. It has three movements, each based on a poem or fantaisie from the collection Gaspard de la Nuit – Fantaisies à la manière de Rembrandt et de Callot completed in 1836 by Aloysius Bertrand. The work was premiered in Paris, on January 9, 1909, by Ricardo Viñes.

The piece is famous for its difficulty, partly because Ravel intended the Scarbo movement to be more difficult than Balakirev's Islamey. Because of its technical challenges and profound musical structure, Scarbo is considered one of the most difficult solo piano pieces in the standard repertoire.

The manuscript currently resides in the Harry Ransom Center of the University of Texas at Austin.

Etymology 
The name "Gaspard" is derived from its original Persian form, denoting "the man in charge of the royal treasures": "Gaspard of the Night" or the treasurer of the night thus creates allusions to someone in charge of all that is jewel-like, dark, mysterious, perhaps even morose.

Of the work, Ravel himself said: "Gaspard has been a devil in coming, but that is only logical since it was he who is the author of the poems. My ambition is to say with notes what a poet expresses with words."

Aloysius Bertrand, author of Gaspard de la Nuit (1842), introduces his collection by attributing them to a mysterious old man met in a park in Dijon, who lent him the book. When he goes in search of M. Gaspard to return the volume, he asks, " 'Tell me where M. Gaspard de la Nuit may be found.' 'He is in hell, provided that he isn't somewhere else', comes the reply. 'Ah! I am beginning to understand! What! Gaspard de la Nuit must be...?' the poet continues. 'Ah! Yes... the devil!' his informant responds. 'Thank you, !... If Gaspard de la Nuit is in hell, may he roast there. I shall publish his book.' "

Structure

I. Ondine

Written in C major and based on the poem "Ondine", an oneiric tale of the water nymph Undine singing to seduce the observer into visiting her kingdom deep at the bottom of a lake. It is reminiscent of Ravel's early piano piece, the Jeux d'eau (1901), with the sounds of water falling and flowing, woven with cascades. 

There are five main melodies. The opening melody at bar 2 evokes a line of song and is similar in form and subject to the main theme in Sirènes from Claude Debussy's Nocturnes. This is interrupted by the second theme at bar 10 before opening up a longer melodic passage formed from the latter part of theme 1. Then a short simple melody first heard at bar 23 introduces shimmering harmonic side-shifting. The final distinct melody is a menacing short rising figure first heard at bar 45, which prefaces the menace of Le Gibet and which later provides a bridge to the main climax at bar 66. Ravel prioritises melodic development to express the poetic themes, keeping subordinate the simmering coloration of the right hand. By contrast, Claude Debussy's works such as Reflets dans l'eau tend to treat melody more equally with harmonic and figurative impulsivity, and often position virtuosity more in the foreground. 

This piece contains technical challenges for the right hand such as the fast repetition of three-note chords in the opening accompaniment, the double note passages beginning at bar 57, and the disjunct climactic movement of the hands beginning at bar 66. 

The duration of Ondine is about 6:30. Recordings vary in tempo, driven perhaps by the tension of keeping the shimmering alternating notes from becoming mechanical, yet giving sufficient space for the lyricism of the melodies.

II. Le Gibet

Written in E minor and based on the poem of the same name, the movement presents the observer with a view of the desert, where the lone corpse of a hanged man on a gibbet stands out against the horizon, reddened by the setting sun. Meanwhile, a bell tolls from inside the walls of a far-off city, creating the deathly atmosphere that surrounds the observer. Throughout the entire piece is a B octave ostinato, imitative of the tolling bell, that remains constant in tone as the notes cross over and dynamics change. The duration of Le Gibet is about 5:15.

III. Scarbo

Written in G minor and based on the poem "Scarbo", this movement depicts the nighttime mischief of a small fiend or goblin, making pirouettes, flitting in and out of the darkness, disappearing and suddenly reappearing. Its uneven flight, hitting and scratching against the walls, casting a growing shadow in the moonlight, creates a nightmarish scene for the observer lying in his bed.

With its repeated notes and two terrifying climaxes, this is the high point in technical difficulty of all the three movements. Technical challenges include repeated notes in both hands, and double-note scales in major seconds in the right hand. Ravel reportedly said about Scarbo: "I wanted to write an orchestral transcription for the piano." The duration of Scarbo is about 8:30.

Orchestral versions
Gaspard was orchestrated by Eugene Goossens in 1942, and by Marius Constant in 1990.

Notes

Sources

External links
 Piano Society.com – Ravel – Gaspard de la nuit – includes free recordings of "Ondine" and "Scarbo".
 
BBC Discovering Music – Includes lecture and performance – 1 hour and 30 minutes

Suites by Maurice Ravel
Compositions for solo piano
1908 compositions
Music based on poems